Bruna Genovese (born 24 September 1976 in Montebelluna) is an Italian long-distance runner who specializes in the marathon race.

Biography
Genovese won the Italian under 21 half-marathon championship in 1998. She ran her first marathon on 24 October 1999 in Venice, and won the 2004 Tokyo International Marathon with Kiyoko Shimahara finishing second and Elfenesh Alemu third.

Achievements
All results regarding marathon, unless stated otherwise

Personal bests
10,000 metres - 33:36.03 min (2005)
Half marathon - 1:11:22  hrs (2005)
Marathon - 2:25:28 hrs (2006)

See also
 Italian all-time lists - Half marathon
 Italian all-time lists - Marathon

References

External links
 
Bruna Genovese at Marathoninfo

1976 births
Living people
People from Montebelluna
Italian female long-distance runners
Italian female marathon runners
Athletes (track and field) at the 2004 Summer Olympics
Athletes (track and field) at the 2008 Summer Olympics
Olympic athletes of Italy
Athletics competitors of Gruppo Sportivo Forestale
World Athletics Championships athletes for Italy
Sportspeople from the Province of Treviso